Esquimalt Airport  was an airport located in Esquimalt, British Columbia, Canada.

References

Defunct airports in British Columbia